A patty melt is a sandwich consisting of a ground beef patty with melted cheese (traditionally Swiss Cheese) and topped with caramelized onions between two slices of griddled bread (traditionally rye or marbled rye, though sourdough or Texas toast are sometimes substituted in some regions, including the Southern U.S.). It is unclear when the patty melt was invented, but records exist of them having been commercially served as early as the 1940s. The patty melt is a variant of the traditional American cheeseburger, taking the burger back to its sandwich inspired roots by serving it on sliced bread versus a bun.

Several culinary writers have suggested that Los Angeles restaurateur Tiny Naylor may have invented the patty melt sometime between 1930 and 1959, depending on the source. Even if Naylor did not invent the sandwich, it is agreed that Naylor and his family helped popularize the sandwich in their respective restaurants, which included Tiny Naylor's, Du-par's, and Wolfgang Puck's Granita, over the past half century or more.

See also
 List of American sandwiches
 List of hamburgers
 List of sandwiches

References

American sandwiches
Cheese sandwiches
Fast food
Hamburgers (food)